The women's high jump competition at the 2006 Asian Games in Doha, Qatar was held on 11 December 2006 at the Khalifa International Stadium.

Schedule
All times are Arabia Standard Time (UTC+03:00)

Records

Results 
Legend
NM — No mark

References

External links 
Results

Athletics at the 2006 Asian Games
2006